Bojnord County is in North Khorasan province, Iran. The capital of the county is the city of Bojnord. At the 2006 census, the county's population was 322,309 in 79,882 households. The following census in 2011 counted 365,896 people in 100,900 households. At the 2016 census, the county's population was 324,083 in 94,457 households, by which time Raz and Jargalan District had been separated from the county to form Raz and Jargalan County.

Administrative divisions

The population history and structural changes of Bojnord County's administrative divisions over three consecutive censuses are shown in the following table. The latest census shows two districts, five rural districts, and three cities.

References

 

Counties of North Khorasan Province